Fictional religions are religions that exist only in works of fiction.

B
 Bene Gesserit – Dune series
 Bokononism – Cat's Cradle by Kurt Vonnegut

C
 Carpathianism – Left Behind series
 Chaos Gods  – Warhammer
 Church of All Worlds – Stranger in a Strange Land by Robert A. Heinlein (inspired a non-fictional religious group of the same name)
Church of Science – the bogus religion established by Salvor Hardin in Isaac Asimov's Foundation
 The Covenant Religion, also known as "The Great Journey" – Halo
 Cthulhu Mythos cults – Cthulhu Mythos
 Cult of Skaro –  Doctor Who

D
 Dinkoism - based on fictional character Dinkan
 Drowned God - A Song of Ice and Fire

E
 Earthseed – Parable of the Sower and its sequel, Parable of the Talents, see Octavia Butler
 Esoteric Order of Dagon –  Cthulhu Mythos

F
 Faith of the Seven – A Song of Ice and FireJ
 Jedi – Star WarsL

 Ladover   - in two novels by Chaim Potok

O
 Order of Wen the Eternally Surprised – Discworld Old Gods - A Song of Ice and FireR
 Robotology – Futurama (Religion in Futurama)

 S 
 Sith – Star WarsZ
 Zensufi – Dune series
 Zensunni – Dune'' series

See also
 Parody religion
 List of fictional clergy and religious figures
 List of fictional deities
 List of fictional holidays
 List of religious ideas in fantasy fiction
 List of religious ideas in science fiction

References

External links

Religions
 
Fictional religions